Tim DeMorat is an American football quarterback. He played college football for the Fordham Rams.

Early life and high school
DeMorat grew up in Merritt Island, Florida and initially attended Merritt Island High School before transferring to Viera High School after his sophomore year. He passed for over 2,400 yards with 23 touchdown passes and eight interceptions as a junior. DeMorat signed to play college football at Fordham.

College career
DeMorat played in ten games with eight starts during his true freshman season and completed 56.1% of his passes for 1,633 yards and 11 touchdowns. As a sophomore, he passed for 2,674 passing yards and 20 touchdowns and was named first team All-Patriot League. DeMorat's junior season was postponed from the fall to the spring of 2021 due to COVID-19. He was named the Patriot League Offensive Player of the Year after completing 92 of 129 pass attempts for 1,049 yards and five touchdowns. His 71% completion percentage led FCS. 

DeMorat completed 234-of-400 passes for 3,214 yards and 31 touchdowns and repeated as the Patriot League Offensive Player of the Year as a senior. He decided to utilize the extra year of eligibility granted to college athletes who played in the 2020 season due to the coronavirus pandemic and return to Fordham for a fifth season. In his final season, DeMorat completed 326 of 499 pass attempts for 4,891 yards and 56 touchdowns with five rushing touchdowns and was the runner-up for the Walter Payton Award. Following the end of the season he was invited to play in the 2023 Hula Bowl and the 2023 East–West Shrine Bowl. DeMorat majored in communication and media studies at Fordham. He finished his college career with 13,461 passing yards, which is third-most in FCS history.

Statistics

References

External links
Fordham Rams profile

Living people
Players of American football from Florida
American football quarterbacks
Fordham Rams football players